Summerville is a city and the county seat of Chattooga County, Georgia, United States. The population was 4,534 at the 2010 census.

History

Summerville was founded in 1838 as the seat of the newly formed Chattooga County. It was incorporated as a town in 1839 and as a city in 1909. Summerville was named from the fact it was a popular summer resort.  The city thrived in the late 1880s with the construction of the Chattanooga, Rome and Columbus Railroad (later part of the Central of Georgia system).

The Chattooga County Courthouse, listed on the National Register of Historic Places, was completed in 1909.  The Summerville Depot, completed by the Central of Georgia in 1918, is also listed on the National Register, and is home to several annual festivals.

Geography 
The city lies along the Chattooga River at the western base of the Taylor Ridge. U.S. Route 27 connects Summerville with Chattanooga, Tennessee, to the north, and Rome to the southeast. Georgia State Route 114 connects the city with Lyerly to the south, and Georgia State Route 48 connects the city with Menlo near the Alabama state line to the west.

Climate

Demographics

2020 census

As of the 2020 United States census, there were 4,435 people, 1,769 households, and 997 families residing in the city.

2000 census
As of the census of 2000, there were 4,556 people, 1,823 households, and 1,141 families residing in the city. The racial makeup of the city was 72.06% White, 25.31% African American, 0.07% Native American, 0.15% Asian, 0.90% from other races, and 1.51% from two or more races. Hispanic or Latino of any race were 1.58% of the population.

There were 1,823 households, out of which 28.7% had children under the age of 18 living with them, 39.8% were married couples living together, 17.8% had a female householder with no husband present, and 37.4% were non-families. 33.0% of all households were made up of individuals, and 16.4% had someone living alone who was 65 years of age or older.  The average household size was 2.39 and the average family size was 3.04.

In the city, the population was spread out, with 24.3% under the age of 18, 9.0% from 18 to 24, 26.5% from 25 to 44, 21.7% from 45 to 64, and 18.5% who were 65 years of age or older.  The median age was 38 years. For every 100 females, there were 84.7 males.  For every 100 females age 18 and over, there were 78.8 males.

The median income for a household in the city was $24,911, and the median income for a family was $35,579. Males had a median income of $26,707 versus $20,222 for females. The per capita income for the city was $15,090.  About 18.1% of families and 20.7% of the population were below the poverty line, including 28.5% of those under age 18 and 20.3% of those age 65 or over.

Education 
Public education in Summerville is administered by the Chattooga County School District. The district operates four elementary schools, one middle school, and one high school. The district has 184 full-time teachers and over 2,834 students.
Leroy Massey Elementary School
Lyerly Elementary School
Menlo Elementary School
Summerville Elementary School
Summerville Middle School
Chattooga County High School

Notable people
 Bobby Lee Cook, noted trial attorney
 Edna Cain Daniel, journalist and publisher
 Howard Finster, folk artist
 Brody Malone, artistic gymnast
 Senorise Perry, NFL player

See also
J.R. Dick Dowdy Park
Paradise Garden

References

External links

Official site

Cities in Chattooga County, Georgia
Cities in Georgia (U.S. state)
Micropolitan areas of Georgia (U.S. state)
County seats in Georgia (U.S. state)